Rob Cooper is an American college baseball coach, currently serving as the head coach of the Penn State Nittany Lions baseball program. Cooper was appointed to the position of head coach prior to the start of the 2014 season.

Early life
Cooper played baseball at Sacramento City College for two years before transferring to the University of Miami for his final two years.  He served as a student assistant coach at Miami in 1994 while finishing his degree.  From 1990–1992, Cooper worked as a scout for the Los Angeles Dodgers.

Coaching career
Cooper earned a graduate assistant coach position at Miami for the 1995 season before moving to Wake Forest for the 1996 season.  He then coached for two seasons at Tulane, where he helped lead the Green Wave to a conference regular season crown in 1997 and an NCAA berth in 1998.  He then returned to Sacramento City College, serving as an assistant coach and recruiting coordinator for five seasons.  Cooper then served one season as an assistant at Oral Roberts before being named head coach at Wright State.  In nine seasons, Cooper led the Raiders to seven 30-win seasons, two Horizon League and three Horizon League baseball tournament championships, and three NCAA Division I Baseball Championship appearances.  Prior to his arrival, the Raiders had finished six of the previous seven seasons with losing records.  In August 2013, Cooper was named head coach at Penn State, a similar rebuilding job to what he faced at Wright State.

Head coaching record
This table shows Cooper's record as a head coach at the Division I level.

See also
 List of current NCAA Division I baseball coaches

References

External links
Rob Cooper, Head Baseball Coach, Penn State University Nittany Lions

Living people
Los Angeles Dodgers scouts
Miami Hurricanes baseball coaches
Miami Hurricanes baseball players
Penn State Nittany Lions baseball coaches
Oral Roberts Golden Eagles baseball coaches
Sacramento City Panthers baseball coaches
Sacramento City Panthers baseball players
Tulane Green Wave baseball coaches
Wake Forest Demon Deacons baseball coaches
Wright State Raiders baseball coaches
Year of birth missing (living people)